G&Y or Gay & young is the name of a youth group and magazine aimed at young LGBT people. It is based in Stoke-on-Trent and releases a few editions each year. It is produced by members of G&Y and its partner youth group Galaxy.

The magazine tackles issues facing the young LGBT people and is designed to help educate them on certain health issues and the LGBT culture. It is funded by the National Health Service.

Galaxy 
Galaxy is a youth group for any young person aged 18 or under living in North Staffordshire, England who identifies as being lesbian, gay or bisexual or who is questioning their sexual orientation. The group runs every Saturday. Along with G&Y, they are both funded by the NHS, as it is one of their projects. Everyone meets every week, and they also forward ideas for the magazine.

Galaxy is an abbreviation for Gay And Lesbian And Bisexual Youth.

Location 
The youth services are situated on The Picadilly Project's grounds, on Picadilly which is situated in the centre of Hanley.

Information 
G&Y Magazine is produced by young people at The Piccadilly Project. It has been made available across North Staffordshire, UK.
In 2007 some members of GALAXY took part in the annual Sanity Fair parade in Stoke-on-Trent, UK.
The Piccadilly Project also has other groups for the LGBT communities targeting different ages (The LGB Drop-in & The Gay Men's Drop-in. Both are 18 plus).
In September 2007 Galaxy also made a Myspace which gives information and news on events about the youth service. It also provided a chance to get new members from the community.

Sources 

Staffs Police Info

Community Services Directory Reference

External links
Source
G&Y Online Magazine
 Galaxy Myspace
Health Promotion Webpage

LGBT-related magazines published in England
LGBT organisations in England
Mass media in Stoke-on-Trent
Magazines with year of establishment missing